Depalpata is a genus of moths of the family Noctuidae.

Species
 Depalpata mirabilis Rothschild, 1919
 Depalpata pridgeoni Joicey & Talbot, 1922

References
 Depalpata at Markku Savela's Lepidoptera and Some Other Life Forms
 Natural History Museum Lepidoptera genus database

Agaristinae